Action art may refer to:

Action painting, a form of abstract expressionism
Performance art and art intervention